Utetheisa maddisoni is a moth in the family Erebidae. It was described by Robinson and Robinson in 1980. It is found on Niue.

References

Moths described in 1980
maddisoni